Wayne Donald Brabender Cole (born October 16, 1945) is an American-born Spanish retired professional basketball player and coach. He acquired Spanish citizenship in 1968, relinquishing his U.S. citizenship to qualify for the Spanish national team. At a height of 6'4" (1.93 m), he could play at either the shooting guard or small forward positions. He was named one of FIBA's 50 Greatest Players in 1991. On February 3, 2008, Brabender was chosen as one of the 50 most influential personalities to European professional club basketball, over the previous half-century, by the EuroLeague Basketball Experts Committee.

College career
Born in Montevideo, Minnesota, Brabender played college basketball at Willmar Junior College (now Ridgewater College) and the University of Minnesota Morris after a high school career at Milan High School.

Club playing career
Brabender was drafted by the Philadelphia 76ers in the 14th round (145th overall) of the 1967 NBA Draft, though he never played in the NBA. Brabender came to Spain in order to gain experience, and he ended up contributing to four EuroLeague titles won by Real Madrid in 1968, 1974, 1978, and 1980. With Real Madrid, he also won 13 Spanish League championships, 7 Spanish Cups, and 4 Intercontinental Cups.

National team playing career
Brabender played for the senior men's Spain national basketball team, and he won the silver medal at the EuroBasket 1973, where he was also named the MVP of the tournament. He also played at the EuroBasket 1971, the 1972 Summer Olympic Games, the 1974 FIBA World Championship, EuroBasket 1975, the 1975 Mediterranean Games, EuroBasket 1977, EuroBasket 1979, the 1980 Summer Olympic Games (where Spain achieved 4th place), EuroBasket 1981, and the 1982 FIBA World Championship.

See also
List of former United States citizens who relinquished their nationality

References

External links 
Euroleague.net Profile
LeyendasBaloncestoRealMadrid.es 

1945 births
Living people
American emigrants to Spain
American expatriate basketball people in Spain
American men's basketball players
Basketball coaches from Minnesota
Basketball players at the 1972 Summer Olympics
Basketball players at the 1980 Summer Olympics
Basketball players from Minnesota
Competitors at the 1975 Mediterranean Games
Junior college men's basketball players in the United States
Liga ACB players
Mediterranean Games competitors for Spain
Minnesota Morris Cougars men's basketball players
Olympic basketball players of Spain
People from Montevideo, Minnesota
Philadelphia 76ers draft picks
Real Madrid Baloncesto players
Real Madrid basketball coaches
Shooting guards
Small forwards
Spanish basketball coaches
Spanish men's basketball players
1974 FIBA World Championship players
1982 FIBA World Championship players